"The Secret Fate of All Life" is the fifth episode of the first season of the American anthology crime drama television series True Detective. The episode was written by series creator Nic Pizzolatto, and directed by executive producer Cary Joji Fukunaga. It was first broadcast on HBO in the United States on February 16, 2014.

The season focuses on Louisiana State Police homicide detectives Rustin "Rust" Cohle (Matthew McConaughey) and Martin "Marty" Hart (Woody Harrelson), who investigate the murder of prostitute Dora Lange in 1995. Seventeen years later, they must revisit the investigation, along with several other unsolved crimes. In the episode, Cohle and Hart find Reggie Ledoux's location and set out to catch him. The events lead to serious repercussions to their careers and personal life.

According to Nielsen Media Research, the episode was seen by an estimated 2.25 million household viewers and gained a 0.9 ratings share among adults aged 18–49. The episode received universal acclaim from critics, who praised the performances, directing, writing and character development. For the episode, Nic Pizzolatto received an Outstanding Writing for a Drama Series nomination at the 66th Primetime Emmy Awards.

Plot

2012
Cohle (Matthew McConaughey) and Hart (Woody Harrelson) separately tell Gilbough (Michael Potts) and Papania (Tory Kittles) about their role in a gunfight with Reggie Ledoux and his cousin, claiming that it involved a big shootout where they barely managed to kill both. At some point, Gilbough and Papania tell Cohle about his role in multiple murders, showing evidence of him being present. Reverend Tuttle's death after Cohle returned to Louisiana is also raising their suspicions, especially as Cohle won't let them inspect a storage unit he is keeping. Upset with the accusations, Cohle leaves his interview.

Based on their interrogation, Gilbough and Papania tell Hart that Cohle may be involved with the killings, citing some coincidences and reserved personality, something that Hart rebuffs. However, as the detectives start piling up more possible scenarios for Cohle, Harts starts to wonder about the idea.

1995
At a bar, Ginger (Joseph Sikora) arranges Cohle to meet Dewall Ledoux (Ólafur Darri Ólafsson), Ledoux's cousin and meth-cooking partner. Cohle tries to get him to change his business but Dewall rejects cooperating with Cohle. After dropping Ginger, Cohle and Hart then follow Dewall in car, eventually locating him to Ledoux's house in the woods. After evading booby traps in the woods, they finally reach Ledoux's compound house.

Cohle and Hart infiltrate the house, arresting Ledoux (Charles Halford) and bringing him outside. As Cohle holds Dewall at gunpoint, Hart inspects the house and opens a trailer parked in the house. After seeing its content, he goes outside and kills Ledoux, who was taunting Cohle with knowledge of "Carcosa". Dewall tries to escape but is shot by Cohle, and accidentally steps on a landmine, killing him. The contents of the trailer turned out to be two children, one of which had already passed away, who were kidnapped and abused in the house. Cohle and Hart then start planting evidence in the area to make it appear like a more lethal gunfight took place. They then leave the area with the children as authorities arrive.

Cohle and Hart are hailed as heroes by the media and their own colleagues. Hart is promoted to Detective Sergeant while Cohle receives commendations. The events also helped Hart with his marriage, with Maggie (Michelle Monaghan) now agreeing to let him spend time with his daughters.

2002
Hart and Maggie are now in a better position with their marriage and often go on double dates with Cohle and his new girlfriend, Laurie (Elizabeth Reaser). Cohle's reputation also improved among the police department for his efficient confession tactics.

Hart's relationship with his daughters also took a turn, as Audrey (Erin Moriarty) starts rebelling against her parents. Eventually, Audrey is arrested for having sex with two adult boys, an event that angers Hart. During an argument, Hart slaps Audrey, causing friction between his family.

Cohle interrogates Guy Francis (Christopher Berry), a man who was charged with double murder. He manages to get a confession out of him. Desperate, Francis wants a plea bargain, claiming that he knows about the man who killed Dora Lange, stating that they never captured him. Cohle refuses to listen until he mentions The Yellow King, prompting Cohle to aggressively attack him until he is restrained by the forces. The next day, Cohle and Hart return to get more details but find that Francis has killed himself. They trace Francis' last call before his death to a payphone, where he was called by his "lawyer".

Cohle visits the tree where Dora Lange was found dead, which is now adorned with twig sculptures, similar to the ones found in Marie Fontenot's playhouse. He also returns to the Light of the Way Academy, finding the same twig sculptures and more drawings in the walls.

Production

Development
In January 2014, the episode's title was revealed as "The Secret Fate of All Life" and it was announced that series creator Nic Pizzolatto had written the episode while executive producer Cary Joji Fukunaga had directed it. This was Pizzolatto's fifth writing credit, and Fukunaga's fifth directing credit.

Reception

Viewers
The episode was watched by 2.25 million viewers, earning a 0.9 in the 18-49 rating demographics on the Nielson ratings scale. This means that 0.9 percent of all households with televisions watched the episode. This was a 13% increase from the previous episode, which was watched by 1.99 million viewers with a 0.8 in the 18-49 demographics.

Critical reviews
"The Secret Fate of All Life" received universal acclaim. Jim Vejvoda of IGN gave the episode an "amazing" 9.7 out of 10 and wrote in his verdict, "Time, crime, truth and lies are all part of this week's tense, creepy, and revelatory episode of True Detective. Cohle's inner darkness is the focal point, although Hart's certainly shows itself as well. Our trust in them is now in doubt even as questions are raised about other characters and events."

Erik Adams of The A.V. Club gave the episode an "A" grade and wrote, "'The Secret Fate Of All Life' marks another pinnacle of daring for True Detective, and it's a daring that has to make way for some hiccups in momentum. Twin Peaks echoes go beyond 'Lonely Souls'; in the space of 20 minutes, it goes through all the awkward throes, fits, and starts that David Lynch and Mark Frost encountered after they revealed Laura Palmer's killer. But 'The Secret Fate Of All Life' also barrels forward with the force of last week's bravura finale, its last 10 or 15 minutes puling the show forward with a determination that Twin Peaks didn't find until Agent Cooper followed Windom Earle into the woods." Britt Hayes of Screen Crush wrote, "The final minutes of last week's episode were a technical feat, for sure, but watching Marty shoot LeDoux in the head without hesitation after seeing something shocking and mysterious was an absolute stunner of a moment. Whatever they could possibly show in that container would both never be as horrific and somehow surpass the horror of our imagination, which is a technical feat in its own right."

Alan Sepinwall of HitFix wrote, "I've said in the past that Nic Pizzolatto seems more interested in the story of Cohle and Hart than in the story of this case. But as we draw ever closer to this season's conclusion, the plot and the characterization are starting to come into balance. It's possible that we're not going to truly understand who killed Dora Lange and why until we truly understand Rust and Marty and exactly what they’re capable of." Gwilym Mumford of The Guardian wrote, "A change of pace and then some in this dark and fast-paced episode. But just what is Rust talking about?" Sam Adams of IndieWire wrote, "Before the premiere of HBO's True Detective, writer Nic Pizzolatto told interviewers, 'The aspects of a police procedural don't interest me at all and I'm certainly not interested in serial killers or serial killer stories', which might lead one to wonder why he'd write a police procedural about the hunt for a serial killer. But with the fifth episode, 'The Secret Fate of All Life', the show, and the investigation it's built around, are starting to spiral outward, suggesting a universe, or universes, of alternate possibilities."

Kenny Herzog of Vulture gave the episode a perfect 5 star rating out of 5 and wrote, "Whatever Pizzolatto and Fukunaga are exploring in the friction between modern justice, personal relationships, and aeonian truths, it is resolving itself through a painstaking storytelling metamorphosis. In 'Secret Fate of Life', the build-up results in both closure and cause for anticipation, making the episode's narrative just the right amount to absorb." Tony Sokol of Den of Geek gave the episode a 4.5 star rating out of 5 and wrote, "Time is a flat circle. Everything we do or have ever done, we will do again. Those kids they found in the forest, Cohle thinks they're going to relive that nightmare over and over on some kind of mystical loop. Me? I'm going to watch the episode again. You wanna see something? Get a warrant." Shane Ryan of Paste gave the episode a 9.8 out of 10 and wrote, "We're caught in a masterpiece, and 'The Secrete Fate of All Life' was to speculation what the acorn is to the oak; both fruit and seed. In a breathless hour, we witnessed the subversion of a standard drama; first the climax, then the resolution, and then the mystery. It was riveting story, and beautiful imagery, and philosophical horror."

Accolades
For the episode, Nic Pizzolatto received an Outstanding Writing for a Drama Series nomination at the 66th Primetime Emmy Awards.

References

External links
 "The Secret Fate of All Life" at HBO
 

2014 American television episodes
True Detective episodes
Television episodes written by Nic Pizzolatto